Joan Clark Netherwood (1932 – 8 February 2021) was an American photographer. With Elinor Cahn and Linda Rich, she was a founder and active participant in the East Baltimore Documentary Survey Project between 1975 and 1980.
Her work is included in the collection of the Smithsonian American Art Museum and the Library of Congress.

References

1932 births
2021 deaths
20th-century American women artists
20th-century American photographers
Documentary photographers
Street photographers
Photographers from South Carolina
American women photographers
People from York, South Carolina
21st-century American women
Women photojournalists